Bryant Pond is a lake in Putnam County, in the U.S. state of New York.

Bryant Pond has the name of one Solomon Bryant.

References

Landforms of Putnam County, New York
Ponds of New York (state)